Christiaan Jan Lodewijk "Chris" van Dam (born 9 July 1963) is a Dutch politician, policeman and prosecutor who served as a member of the House of Representatives from 2017 to 2021. He is a member of the Christian Democratic Appeal (CDA).

Biography
Chris van Dam was a police officer for 12 years in The Hague before becoming a prosecutor. He mainly worked in Amsterdam, where he was deputy head officer at the public ministry's local branch from 2014 to 2016 before moving back to The Hague to occupy the same position there.

Elected to the House of Representatives in 2017 for the Christian Democratic Appeal, he has cautioned against the overuse of facial recognition technology as a parliamentarian, suggesting that it is "to the detriment of human values", as people become mere data points.

References

1963 births
Living people
Dutch prosecutors
Dutch police officers
Christian Democratic Appeal politicians
Members of the House of Representatives (Netherlands)
Politicians from The Hague